Nettie is a census-designated place (CDP) in Nicholas County, West Virginia, United States. Nettie is the location of the southern convergence of state routes 20 and 39. As of the 2020 census, its population was 494.

References

Census-designated places in Nicholas County, West Virginia
Census-designated places in West Virginia